Fulwell is a hamlet in the civil parish of Enstone in Oxfordshire, England. Fulwell's toponym is derived from its "foul well". The hamlet was part of the manor of Spelsbury in the ancient parish and later civil parish of Spelsbury. In 1985 Fulwell was transferred to the civil parish of Enstone.

References

Hamlets in Oxfordshire
West Oxfordshire District